Gerald Murray may refer to:
 Gerald R. Murray, United States Air Force airman
 Gerald C. Murray, Canadian Roman Catholic bishop